Anna MacKinnon (formerly Fairclough;  born November 11, 1957) is an American Republican politician who is formerly a member of the Alaska Senate, representing District G from 2013 to 2018.  Prior to that, she served in the Alaska House of Representatives, representing the 17th district, from 2007 to 2013.  In the 26th Alaska State Legislature, she was a member of the House Finance Committee, and chair of the Education & Early Development, Labor & Workforce Development and the University Of Alaska Finance Subcommittees.  She also represented Eagle River and Chugiak on the Anchorage Assembly from 1999 until being elected to the House. She was elected to each of these offices by defeating an incumbent in the election; her Assembly victory was over incumbent Ted Carlson, better known as the Anchorage police officer who arrested actor Steve McQueen in 1972.  Her House victory came in the 2006 primary over incumbent Pete Kott, who by that point was involved in what became known as the Alaska political corruption probe, and who was later sentenced to federal prison. The probe also saw other longtime legislators leave office.  Her Senate victory in 2012 came over longtime legislator Bettye Davis, who faced not only redistricting but a primary election challenge from former House member and congressional candidate Harry Crawford, whom Davis narrowly outpolled.

Personal life
MacKinnon has two children, Cory and Garret. She is a graduate of Service High School, and also attended school for a time in Unalaska. She later studied finance at the University of Alaska Anchorage and the University of Alaska Fairbanks although she did not obtain an undergraduate degree.

Formerly Anna Fairclough, she changed her last name after marrying John MacKinnon on September 20, 2014.

References

External links
 Alaska State House Majority Site
 Alaska State Legislature Biography
 Project Vote Smart profile
 Anna Fairclough at 100 Years of Alaska's Legislature

1957 births
Republican Party Alaska state senators
Anchorage Assembly members
Living people
Republican Party members of the Alaska House of Representatives
People from Auburn, Washington
People from Unalaska, Alaska
Women state legislators in Alaska
Women city councillors in Alaska
21st-century American politicians
21st-century American women politicians